"I Promised Myself" is a song written and originally performed by English singer Nick Kamen. Originally released on his album Move Until We Fly (1990), it was released as a single in the same year and, as a remix in 2004. The original version achieved success in Europe, including Austria and Sweden where it topped the charts. It has been covered multiple times by artists such as Dead or Alive, A-Teens and Basshunter.

Track listings

Charts

Weekly charts

Year-end charts

Certifications

A-Teens version

"I Promised Myself" was covered by Swedish pop group A-Teens and released on 28 April 2004 as the group's final single. It was one of three new songs to be included on their 2004 compilation album, Greatest Hits. It was produced by Grizzly and Tysper.

Music video
The video was directed by Gustav Jonhson and was filmed in Sweden and shows the band's members images inserted in scenes from past videos, so that they appear to be interacting with the teenagers they were before.

Track listings

Weekly charts

Year-end charts

Basshunter version

Swedish musician Basshunter covered the song on his fifth studio album, Bass Generation. The single was released on 30 November 2009. It was produced by Basshunter. "I Promised Myself" is two minutes and 38 seconds long and has a tempo of 150 beats per minute. Basshunter describing his cover of "I Promised Myself" said that it has similar setup to "Now You're Gone" with improved bass drums and bassline and it is more rhythmic. Grant Black from BBC describing the song said that it has no sign of a verse, and it sounds like previous Basshunter songs. In his opinion song with this sentiment should not have a sniff of a dance backing but he also understood that Basshunter can't make songs without bass. He appreciated that Basshunter really does try to sing, and he kind of pulls it off.

Music video
Music video for "I Promised Myself" was directed in Málaga by Alex Herron. Music video was released by Hard2Beat Records on 15 October 2009. Anders Anderson was assistant director and Maz Makhani was camera operator. On 19 November, the Pete Hammond Remix was released.

In the music video, Basshunter goes through all the trouble of finding Aylar Lie after receiving an unseen call from a friend telling him that they have found her and that he needs to get to the hospital. Whilst in the taxi to the hospital he looks out the window and then down at his phone in his hands that shows pictures of Aylar Lie and then recalls memories of them together, including those from "Angel in the Night" and "I Miss You"; Even playing the Wii game Wii Sports. The taxi then gets stuck in traffic so Basshunter starts walking to the hospital. He then arrives at the hospital and asks where he can find Aylar and goes in search for her whilst remembering the last night he saw her in the "Every Morning" music video. He finds the room, opens the door but then finds her with her ex-boyfriend, Lucas, from the music videos "All I Ever Wanted" and "Now You're Gone". This video has left yet another cliffhanger in the story of Basshunter and his quest of getting the girl he wants forever.

Track listings

Charts

Other versions
In 1999, it was covered and released as a single by Lars A. Fredriksen.
In 2000, it was covered and released as a single by John Davies, reaching number 46 in Germany and number 49 in Switzerland. It was also released on the album Fragile, by Dead or Alive.
In 2007, it was covered and released as a single by José Galisteo.
In 2009, it was covered and released as a single by DJ Antoine, reaching number 40 in Switzerland.
In 2014, a German Schlager version was released titled "Pommes mit Senf (I Promised Myself)" by Robert Haag and Markus Becker.
In 2020, it was covered and released as a single by Alfredo Nini, Italian DJ and producer.

Notes

References

1990 singles
1990 songs
2004 singles
2009 singles
A-Teens songs
Atlantic Records singles
Basshunter songs
Ministry of Sound singles
Nick Kamen songs
Number-one singles in Austria
Number-one singles in Sweden
Song recordings produced by Basshunter
Ultra Records singles
Universal Music Group singles
Warner Music Sweden singles